Service science, management, and engineering (SSME) is a term introduced by IBM to describe an interdisciplinary approach to the study and innovation of service systems. More precisely, SSME has been defined as the application of science, management, and engineering disciplines to tasks that one organization beneficially performs for and with another. SSME is also a proposed academic discipline and research area that would complement – rather than replace – the many disciplines that contribute to knowledge about service. The interdisciplinary nature of the field calls for a curriculum and competencies to advance the development and contribution of the field of SSME.

Service systems
Service systems are designed and constructed, are often very large, and, as complex systems, they have emergent properties. This makes them an engineering kind of system (in MIT's terms).  For instance, large-scale service systems include major metropolitan hospitals, highway or high-rise construction projects, and large IT outsourcing operations in which one company takes over the daily operations of IT infrastructure for another. In all these cases, systems are designed and constructed to provide and sustain service, yet because of their complexity and size, operations do not always go as planned or expected, and not all interactions or results can be anticipated or accurately predicted.

As the world becomes more complex and uncertain socially and economically, a computational thinking approach has been proposed to model the dynamics and adaptiveness of a service system, aimed at fully leveraging today's ubiquitous digitized information, computing capability and computational power so that the service system can be studied qualitatively and quantitatively.

Service Science
SSME is often referred to as service science for short.  The flagship journal Service Science] is published by the professional association INFORMS. The journal publishes innovative and original papers on all topics related to service, including work that crosses traditional disciplinary boundaries.

See also

 Customer service
 Enterprise architecture
 Managed services
 Service (economics)
 Service design
 Service dominant logic (marketing)
 Service economy
 Service management
 Services marketing
 Service provider
 Service system
 System
 Web service
 Secure Operations Language
 Viable systems approach

References

Further reading

 Rennick, Dawn M (2015) "Moving the high tech industry forward toward service science competency: A case study of ABC association", "Doctoral dissertation, Capella University"
 Hefley B, Murphy W (eds.) (2008) "Service Science, Management, and Engineering: Education for the 21st Century." New York NY USA: Springer.
 Xiong G, Liu Z, Liu XW, Zhu, Shen D (2013) "Service Science, Management, and Engineering: Theory and Applications." Cambridge MA USA: Academic Press.
 Cardoso J, Fromm H, Nickel S, Satzger G, Studer R, Weinhardt C (2015) "Fundamentals of Service Systems." New York NY USA: Springer.
 Kijima K (ed.) (2010) "Service Systems Science." New York NY USA: Springer. 
 Qiu RG (2014) "Service Science: The Foundations of Service Engineering and Management." Hoboken NJ USA: John Wiley & Sons.
 Galvendy S, Karwowski W (eds.) (2010) "Introduction to Service Engineering." Hoboken NJ USA: John Wiley & Sons.
 Andersen B, Howells J, Hull R, Miles I, Roberts J (eds.) (2000) "Knowledge and Innovation in the New Service Economy." Cheltenham UK: Edward Elgar.
 Metcalfe JS, Miles I (eds.) (2000) "Innovation Systems in the Service Economy: Measurement and Case Study Analysis." New York NY USA: Springer.
 Gadrey J, Gallouj F (eds.) (2002) "Productivity, Innovation and Knowledge in Services: New Economic and Socio-Economic Approaches." Cheltenham UK: Edward Elgar.
 Maglio PP, Kieliszewski CA, Spohrer JC (eds.) (2010) “Handbook of Service Science.” New York NY USA: Springer.
 Pym D, Taylor R, Tofts C (2007) "Public Services Innovation through Technology." Bristol UK: Hewlett-Packard.

Services sector of the economy